Albania has competed at the IAAF World Athletics Championships on fifteen occasions, and did not send a delegation for the 1987 edition. Its competing country code is ALB. The country has not won any medals at the competition and as of 2017 no Albanian athlete has reached the top eight of an event. Its best performance is by Mirela Manjani, who placed twelfth in the 1995 women's javelin throw final. Manjani later won two gold medals competing for Greece.

References 

 
Albania
World Championships in Athletics